Mawer is a locality in the Rural Municipality of Eyebrow No. 193, Saskatchewan, Canada. It previously held the status of village until December 31, 1967. It is located on the former Grand Trunk Pacific (now Canadian National Railways) rail line.

See also

 List of communities in Saskatchewan

References

Bohi & Kozma - Canadian National's Western Stations

Eyebrow No. 193, Saskatchewan
Former villages in Saskatchewan
Unincorporated communities in Saskatchewan